The Chairman of the KGB was the head of the Soviet KGB. He was assisted by one or two First Deputy Chairmen, and four to six Deputy Chairmen. He was also the head of the Collegium of the KGB— which consisted of the Chairman, deputy chairmen, Directorate Chiefs, and one or two republic-level KGB organization chairmen— who affected key policy decisions.

In 1934–1943 the Soviet State Security agency was part of People's Commissariat of Interior (NKVD) as Main Directorate of State Security (GUGB). Director of GUGB was the first deputy of People's Commissar of Interior.

List

See also
Chronology of Soviet secret police agencies
Director of the Federal Security Service
Director of the Foreign Intelligence Service

Citations

Sources
 Christopher Andrew and Vasili Mitrokhin, The Mitrokhin Archive: The KGB in Europe and the West, Gardners Books (2000),  Basic Books (1999), hardcover, ; trade paperback (September, 2000), 
 John Barron, "KGB: The Secret Work of Soviet Secret Agents",Reader's Digest Press (1974), 
 Vasili Mitrokhin and Christopher Andrew, The World Was Going Our Way: The KGB and the Battle for the Third World, Basic Books (2005) hardcover, 677 pages

Further reading
 Yevgenia Albats and Catherine A. Fitzpatrick. The State Within a State: The KGB and Its Hold on RussiaPast, Present, and Future. Farrar Straus Giroux (1994) .
 John Barron. KGB: The Secret Works Of Soviet Secret Agents. Bantam Books (1981) 
 Vadim J. Birstein. The Perversion Of Knowledge: The True Story of Soviet Science. Westview Press (2004)  (describes a secret KGB lab engaged in development and testing of poisons)
 John Dziak, Chekisty: A History of the KGB, Lexington Books (1988) 
 
 Бережков, Василий Иванович (2004). Руководители Ленинградского управления КГБ : 1954-1991. Санкт-Петербург: Выбор, 2004.  (in Russian)

External links
KGB Information Center from FAS.org
 Chebrikov, Viktor M., et al., eds. Istoriya sovetskikh organov gosudarstvennoi bezopasnosti. (1977) 
 Slaves of KGB. 20th Century. The religion of betrayal (Russian) - book by Yuri Shchekochikhin

 
KGB